Abagrotis scopeops is a moth of the family Noctuidae first described by Harrison Gray Dyar Jr. in 1904. It is found in North America from southern British Columbia, south through western Montana, Idaho, Utah and Nevada down to southern California.

The wingspan is about 36 mm. Adults are on wing in early fall.

References

scopeops
Moths of North America
Moths described in 1904